Harijs Mellups (1927–1950) was a Latvian football and ice hockey player. Mellups died in the 1950 Sverdlovsk plane crash at age 23.

Biography
Mellups came from Sarkandaugava in Riga where he played football in the streets and ice hockey on a frozen river in the winter. His first football club was Aldaris for which Mellups played as a left side forward. In addition to football Mellups played basketball, was an ice hockey goalkeeper and also competed in boxing. In boxing aged 18 Mellups was nominated for the Latvia national team. In 1945 he was the champion of Riga in his weight division.

However, by 1945 Mellups had decided to pursue his career in two sports: ice hockey and football.

In 1945 with FK Dinamo Rīga Mellups won the Latvian championship in football. Mellups had a very good goal sense and was highly skilled in playing one-on-one. In 1946 with Dinamo Rīga he also won the Latvian championship in ice hockey, as a goalkeeper with Dinamo he allowed just 3 goals in the entire season.

In 1949 he transferred to Moscow where he also played both football and hockey on the highest level. Every year from 1947 Mellups was selected in the symbolic selection of best players of the Soviet ice hockey league. Mellups died in an airplane crash together with Roberts Šūlmanis and several other ice hockey players.

1927 births
1950 deaths
Ice hockey people from Riga
Latvian ice hockey players
Latvian footballers
Soviet ice hockey players
Dinamo Riga players
Victims of aviation accidents or incidents in the Soviet Union
Victims of aviation accidents or incidents in 1950
Association footballers not categorized by position
Footballers from Riga